"Stars in the Sky" is a song by American musician Kid Cudi. It was created for the film Sonic the Hedgehog 2 (2022) and was released as a single in promotion for the film on March 25, 2022. The song was written by Cudi himself, alongside Lil Nas X and producers Splititupbenji, Take a Daytrip, and Dot da Genius.

Background
"Stars in the Sky" was released at midnight on March 25, 2022, the song was available for pre-save on music streaming services the day prior.

On April 28, 2022, an early version of the song titled "STARZ", with additional vocals from Lil Nas X, and a different instrumental from the final version, was leaked online.

Reception
Tom Breihan of Stereogum, says that song "is a bleepy, uptempo dance-pop track produced by Take a Daytrip and Dot da Genius. It’s got Cudi singing some very happy melodies through a whole lot of Auto-Tune, and it definitely sounds like a song from a kids’ movie." Breihan also says: "A pretty weird look for Kid Cudi! But maybe it’ll be a hit! The song’s video plunges Cudi into the Sonic universe."

Music video
The music video was directed by William Lebeda for Picturemill. The video displays Kid Cudi in a recording studio recording the song, but he is interrupted by a message from Doctor Robotnik on his cell phone, who invites Cudi to join him. Cudi apparently accepts and leaves the studio, where he finds the Eggmobile, Robotnik's vehicle. Then Cudi starts the vehicle and starts flying off at high speed while continuing to sing the song, in addition to the video clip showing footages (some hitherto unpublished) of Sonic the Hedgehog 2, both in its original filmage version and in a 16-bit recreation.

In the final moments of the music video, in the Labyrinth Zone, Cudi discovers Robotnik's true intention to have called him, to help the doctor steal the Master Emerald. The musician teams up with Sonic and Tails to stop Robotnik, who is already in Green Hills, inside a giant robot resembling himself, which is powered by the power of the emerald. Cudi also builds a mech that resembles himself and with one punch, destroys Robotnik's robot, and later, celebrates with a fist bump with Tails and Sonic, who gives the musician one of his powered quills and opens a ring portal so Cudi can return to the recording studio.

Live performances
On April 9, 2022, Cudi performed a medley of "Stars in the Sky" and "Pursuit of Happiness" at the Kids' Choice Awards for the first time.

Track listing
Digital download
Stars In The Sky — 3:05

References

External links

2022 songs
2022 singles
Kid Cudi songs
Republic Records singles
Songs written by Kid Cudi
Songs written by Dot da Genius
Sonic the Hedgehog
Songs written for films
Song recordings produced by Take a Daytrip
Songs written by Lil Nas X
Animated music videos
American electronic songs
American pop songs